Gaston Bonheur, pseudonym for Gaston Tesseyre (27 November 1913 – 4 September 1980) was a French journalist and writer.  He is known for writing the screenplay for the 1955 film version of Lady Chatterley's Lover.

Biography 
Gaston Tesseyre's parents were teachers. His father was killed at the very beginning of the First World War and when Gaston was an infant. The future writer learned the Occitan language and the art of winemaking from his grandmother Bonhoure, from whom he also took his pen name.

First a poet, close to the surrealists, he founded the magazine "Choc". He then moved on to journalism. He was hired by :fr:Pierre Lazareff as chief reporter for the daily Paris-Soir. In 1947 he was editor-in-chief at the weekly Paris Match and in 1948,  editor-in-chief of the daily Paris-Presse.  For several years he was the director of the press empire of Jean Prouvost which included the publications Télé 7 Jours, Le Figaro, Paris Match, and France-Soir.

He also wrote songs. His book "Qui a cassé le vase de Soissons?", which enjoyed wide popular acclaim in the 1960's, is a half-sarcastic, half-nostalgic recollection of his mother as a schoolteacher.

Bonheur is buried in Floure Cemetery (Aude).

Works 

 Chemin privé (poems), 
1934: La Mauvaise fréquentation, Éditions Gallimard
1937: Les Garçons
1940: La Cavalcade héroïque, Fayard
1945: Le Glaive nu, éd. Les Trois Collines
1953: Tournebelle
1958: Charles de Gaulle, Gallimard
1963: Qui a cassé le vase de Soissons ?, Robert Laffont
1965: La République nous appelle, Robert Laffont
1965: Rue des Rosiers (song performed by Régine), Pathé
1970: Qui a cassé le pot au lait ? , Robert Laffont
1970: Si le Midi avait voulu, Robert Laffont
1974: Notre patrie gauloise, Robert Laffont
1976: La Croix de ma mère, Éditions Julliard
1977: Henri Quatre
1978: Le Soleil oblique, éd. Julliard
1980: L'Ardoise et la craie, Éditions de la Table ronde
1980: Paris bonheur, éd. Richer

References

External links 

 Gaston Bonheur on Gallimard
 Promenade à Carcassonne avec Gaston Bonheur (vidéo)
 Gaston Bonheur à Radioscopie (audio)

People from Aude
1913 births
1980 deaths
Winners of the Prix Broquette-Gonin (literature)
20th-century French journalists
20th-century French writers
20th-century French male writers
French male non-fiction writers
Prix Guillaume Apollinaire winners
20th-century pseudonymous writers